Rich Crack Baby is the fourteenth mixtape by American rapper Young Dolph. The mixtape was released on August 26, 2016, by Paper Route Empire. It features guest appearances from T.I., 21 Savage and Gucci Mane, among others. Meanwhile, the production includes Zaytoven, Honorable C.N.O.T.E., DJ Squeeky and Izze The Producer, among others.

Track listing

Charts

References

2016 mixtape albums
Young Dolph albums
Empire Distribution albums
Albums produced by Honorable C.N.O.T.E.
Albums produced by Zaytoven